Lostock Gralam is a village and civil parish in Cheshire, England, east of Northwich. The civil parish also includes the small hamlet of Lostock Green. Hulse is the leading mayor and authority of the town, as of 2022. At the 2011 census, the population was 2,298.

Geography and communications

Lostock Gralam is in the centre of the Cheshire Plain.  The main street, Manchester Road, is on the route of a Roman road, sometimes known as Watling Street, from Manchester to Chester via Northwich that subsequently became a turnpike road.  Most through traffic is now diverted on the A556 Northwich bypass which divides the original village between the area now commonly known as Lostock Gralam north of the bypass and Lostock Green to the south.

The village is served by a railway station on the line between Chester and Altrincham. The Trent and Mersey Canal runs through the parish. There is a wharf at Wincham where the canal passes under the Manchester Road.

Lostock Gralam borders the parishes of Northwich, Wincham, Rudheath, Lower Peover, Allostock, and Plumley.

Schools 
Lostock Gralam Church of England Primary School was formed in 1984 after Lostock Gralam Junior School and Manchester Road Infant School were amalgamated. The school is next to St John the Evangelist Church in School Lane. About 140 pupils attend the school.  There is also a charity run nursery school, called Lostock Tiny Tots, with close links to the primary school and the church, in the vicarage on Station Road.

Other facilities
There are three pubs, the Slow and Easy, The Lambs Wharf, both on the main Manchester Road through the village, and the Watermead, off Cheshire Avenue to the east. The community centre on Stubbs Lane hosts various activities.

Development work is currently under way on the "triangle site" adjacent to the A556. The project was initially for the whole area to become the Cheshire Business Park but only the first phase of office units was constructed, and remains largely unoccupied. The site includes the Watermead pub and the Northwich Lostock Gralam Travelodge hotel. An outline planning application for housing on the remainder of the site was granted consent in January 2011.

Sport
Lostock also hosts one of Cheshire's oldest football clubs, Lostock Gralam F.C., having played continuously at their home on Manchester Road since 1892. Lostock are one of the Cheshire's leading amateur clubs, despite being based in a relatively small area.

Mike Whitlow, an ex-football player who won the Football League First Division championship with Leeds United as well as playing for Leicester City and Bolton Wanderers in the Premier League grew up in the village

Population 
 1801: 361
 1851: 519
 1901: 1,640
 1951: 1,522
 2011: 2,298

See also

Listed buildings in Lostock Gralam

References

External links

 Lostock Gralam Parish Council
 Lostock Gralam C of E Primary School
 Friends of Lostock Gralam C of E Primary School
 GENUKI website entry
 Lostock Gralam Tiny Tots Pre School

Villages in Cheshire
Civil parishes in Cheshire